Dal Khalsa UK was the first unit of Dal Khalsa (International) established outside of  Punjab. During the 1980s, Dal Khalsa UK was at the forefront of spearheading the Sikh freedom struggle in the UK, alongside other Sikh Groups. Under the leadership of
Sardar Manmohan Singh Ji Khalsa, the Vice President of Dal Khalsa International, Dal Khalsa UK  led protests against the 1984 Sikh Massacres in India and the military attack on the Harmandir Sahib (the Golden Temple), the Sikhs' holiest shrine.  They held rallies in support of an independent Sikh state of Khalistan and continue to do so. The organisation's primary base is in London.

Campaigns

Dal Khalsa UK, as with the wider Dal Khalsa (International), believes in freedom as a goal in the form of a separate nation of Khalistan for the Sikh Nation. This is one of the core aims of the organisation, as of 2010, Dal Khalsa UK is one of the leading Khalistani groups in the United Kingdom and Europe. Dal Khalsa UK as with the wider Dal Khalsa (International)

In 2007, Dal Khalsa UK led a campaign to ban the Rashtriya Swayamsevak Sangh in the UK, which resulted in widespread awareness of this Hindu group. Dal Khalsa UK alongside the Council of Khalistan (UK) led Sikh delegations to present the case for the Sikh right to self-determination in Khalistan and to lobby for Sikh human rights in front of the United Nations Human Rights Council in Geneva.

Members see the militant Sant Jarnail Singh Ji Khalsa (Bhindranwale) as one of the main iconic Sikh figures from which the organisation draws inspiration, alongside Bhai Gajinder Singh, founder of Dal Khalsa (International), who has been in exile since 1981.

Events
Dal Khalsa UK, alongside other major Sikh groups, organise a remembrance march and freedom rally in Central London every June to mark the anti-Sikh riots of 1984, which attracts around 50,000 Sikhs every year.

References

External links
Dal Khalsa International Website

Khalistan movement